The Distinguished Service to Music Medal is an award presented by Kappa Kappa Psi, National Honorary Band Fraternity. It is awarded to people who have contributed to the advancement of the wind band "as a cultural, musical and educational medium." The Distinguished Service to Music Medal has been awarded 137 times to 134 recipients.

The decoration itself is a golden star enameled in the fraternity colors of blue and white. The star, which symbolizes the fraternity ritual and motto, "Strive for the Highest", is surrounded by a golden laurel wreath, symbolizing achievement. Upon the star is the fraternity crest and the words "Distinguished Service" with the Greek letters "ΚΚΨ." The medal is surmounted by a lyre representing the field of music. The decoration may be worn suspended by a blue and white ribbon, for formal occasions or musical performances. The medal was designed by Jack K. Lee, Grand President from 1963 to 1965, and was first awarded to ten men and women.

Recipients

First recipients 

The first recipients of the Distinguished Service to Music Medal were awarded it in late 1964 and early 1965. The reasons for which these ten men and women were awarded the medal served as the basis for the categories for later awardees.

 Morton Gould (Composition)
 Frank Simon and William Revelli (Concert Band)
 Eugene J. Weigel (Marching Band)
 Sigurd Raschèr (Artist Performer)
 Earl Kent of C.G. Conn (Industrial Research and Progress)
 Meredith Willson for The Music Man (Contributing Layman)
 Herman B Wells (Alumni Achievement)
 A. Frank Martin and Grace F. Martin (Fraternity Service)

All awardees 
Following is a list of all recipients of the award, from 1963 to the present.

 1963–65
 Morton Gould, Composition
 Frank Simon, Concert Band
 William Revelli, Concert Band
 Eugene J. Weigel, Marching Band
 Sigurd Raschèr, Artist Performer
 Earl Kent, Industrial Research and Progress
 Meredith Willson, Contributing Layman
 Herman B. Wells, Alumni Achievement
 A. Frank Martin, Fraternity Service
 Grace F. Martin, Fraternity Service

 1965–67
Karl King, Composition
 Harold Bachman, Concert Band
 Glenn C. Bainum, Marching Band
 H. E. Nutt, Instrumental Music Education
Paul V. Yoder, Instrumental Music Education
 Leonard Smith, Artist Performer
 Guggenheim family of New York, Contributing Layman
 F. Lee Bowling, Alumni Achievement
 J. Lee Burke, Fraternity Service
 William A. Scroggs, Fraternity Service

 1967–69
 Clarence Sawhill, Concert Band
 Manley Whitcomb, Instrumental Music Education
 Leonard Falcone, Artist Performer
 Nels Vogel, Industrial Research and Progress
 Adolph Ostwald, Contributing Layman
 1969–71
 Lucien Cailliet, Composition
 Richard Franko Goldman, Concert Band
 Jack K. Lee, Marching Band
 Robert Arthur, Instrumental Music Education
 Doc Severinsen, Artist Performer
 Traugott Rohner, Industrial Research and Progress
 Donald Moore, Fraternity Service

 1971–73
Robert E. Jager, Composition
 Mark Hindsley, Concert Band
 William P. Foster, Marching Band
 William Moffitt, Marching Band
 Bertram Francis, Instrumental Music Education
 Eugene Rousseau, Artist Performer
 Nilo Harvey, Industrial Research and Progress
 Forrest McAlister, Contributing Layman
 D. O. Wiley, Fraternity Service
 1975–77
 Robert Russell Bennett, Composition
 Hiram Henry, Instrumental Music Education
 Robert Kamm, Contributing Layman

 1977–79
 Raymond Dvorak, Concert Band
 Frederick Fennell, Concert Band
 Colonel Arnald Gabriel, Concert Band
 Harvey Phillips, Artist Performer

 1979–81
 Truman Crawford, Marching Band
 John Long, Instrumental Music Education

 1981–83
 Al G. Wright, Concert Band and Marching Band

 1983–85
 Charles Carter, Composition
 Richard Bowles, Instrumental Music Education
 Louis Sudler, Contributing Layman

 1985–87
 Clare Grundman, Composition
 Harry Begian, Concert Band
 Colonel John R. Bourgeois, Concert Band
 John Paynter, Concert Band

 1987–89
 W. Francis McBeth, Composition
 Claude T. Smith, Composition
 Fisher Tull, Composition
 Ray Cramer, Instrumental Music Education

 1989–91
Alfred Reed, Composition
 Hugh McMillen, Concert Band, Alumni Achievement, and Fraternity Service
 James K. Copenhaver, Instrumental Music Education
 Stanley F. Michalski Jr., Instrumental Music Education
 James G. Saied, Contributing Layman
 Max Mitchell, Fraternity Service
 Susan Mitchell, Fraternity Service

 1991–93
 James Barnes, Composition
 H. Owen Reed, Composition
 Kenneth G. Bloomquist, Concert Band
 Richard Strange, Concert Band
 Walter M. Chesnut, Instrumental Music Education
 Thomas Henry Delaine, Instrumental Music Education
 Emery L. Fears, Instrumental Music Education
 Henry Levy, Instrumental Music Education
 Stanley G. Finck, Fraternity Service

 1993–95
 H. Robert Reynolds, Concert Band
 James Sudduth, Concert Band
 Conrad Hutchinson Jr., Marching Band

 1995–97
 Frank B. Wickes, Concert Band
 Don Wilcox, Concert Band
 Richard Worthington, Concert Band
 Kenneth M. Corbett, Fraternity Service

 1997–99
 James Croft, Concert Band
 James Jacobsen, Instrumental Music Education
 Elden Janzen, Instrumental Music Education
 Gary Langford, Instrumental Music Education
 Clifford Madsen, Instrumental Music Education

 1999–2001
 Frank Ticheli, Composition
 Robert Foster, Concert Band
 Gary Garner, Concert Band
 John Whitwell, Concert Band
 Keith Bearden, Marching Band
 Robert "Coach" Fleming, Marching Band
 Gary E. Smith, Marching Band
 Frederick Hemke, Instrumental Music Education
 Tim Lautzenheiser, Instrumental Music Education
 Jim Cochrane, Industrial Research and Progress

 2001–03
 Ken Singleton, Instrumental Music Education
 Melvin Miles Jr., Instrumental Music Education
 Alfred Sergel III, Instrumental Music Education
 Christopher Haughee, Fraternity Service

 2003–05
 Melborn Nixon, Instrumental Music Education

 2005–07
 Karel Husa, Composition
 Donald Grantham, Composition
 Craig Kirchoff, Concert Band
 James F. Keene, Concert Band
 Johnnie Vinson, Concert Band
 Issac Greggs, Marching Band
 Jack R. Anderson, Marching Band
 Paul Droste, Instrumental Music Education
 Bentley Shellahammer, Instrumental Music Education
 Don McGinnis, Conducting
 William Gora, Conducting
 Steve West, Industry

 2007–09
 George N. Parks, Marching Band
 Jon R. Woods, Marching Band
 Scott E. Stowell, Fraternity Service
 Joseph Hermann, Conducting

 2009–11
 Adam Gorb, Composition
 Mark Camphouse, Composition
 Joseph P. Missal, Concert Band
 William V. Johnson, Concert Band
 David Patrick Dunnigan, Marching Band
 Julian White, Marching Band
 David Gregory, Instrumental Music Education
 Earl Dunn, Instrumental Music Education
 Lt. Colonel Alan L. Bonner, Conducting
 Michael Haithcock, Conducting
 Jerry F. Junkin, Conducting
 Mark Morette, Industry

 2011–13
 Paula Crider, Conducting
 William K. Wakefield

Multiple recipients 
Hugh E. McMillen, former Director of Bands at the University of Colorado at Boulder and Past National President of Kappa Kappa Psi, has been awarded the medal for three causes: for concert band, alumni achievement, and fraternity service. Al G. Wright, Director of Bands Emeritus at Purdue University, is the only other person to receive the award in more than one category: concert band and marching band.

References 

Kappa Kappa Psi
American music awards
Awards established in 1963